Albert Timmer (born 13 June 1985) is a Dutch former road bicycle racer, who competed professionally between 2007 and 2017, exclusively for  and its previous squad iterations.

Career
Born in Gramsbergen, Timmer competed in the 2012 Tour de France where he finished in 148th position. He later competed in the 2014 Tour de France where he finished in 146th position.

Major results

2006
 9th Overall Flèche du Sud
2007
 6th Overall Tour of Qinghai Lake
2008
 1st Stage 1b (TTT) Brixia Tour
2010
 8th Hel van het Mergelland
2012
 1st  Mountains classification Tour de Luxembourg
2013
 6th Münsterland Giro
2014
 4th Grand Prix Impanis-Van Petegem
 7th Overall Ster ZLM Toer

Grand Tour general classification results timeline

References

External links

Cycling News Profile

1985 births
Living people
Dutch male cyclists
People from Hardenberg
Cyclists from Overijssel
20th-century Dutch people
21st-century Dutch people